Sergejus Jovaiša (born 17 December 1954 in Anykščiai) is a former basketball player from Soviet Union and Lithuania. He played at the shooting guard position and won the bronze medal with the Lithuania national basketball team at the 1992 Summer Olympics in Barcelona, Spain. In 1980 he was a member of the Soviet team that won the bronze medal at the 1980 Summer Olympics.

References

External links
 databaseOlympics
 Sergejus Jovaiša FIBA.com

1954 births
Living people
1982 FIBA World Championship players
21st-century Lithuanian politicians
Basketball players at the 1980 Summer Olympics
Basketball players at the 1992 Summer Olympics
BC Žalgiris players
FIBA EuroBasket-winning players
FIBA World Championship-winning players
Honoured Masters of Sport of the USSR
Lithuanian men's basketball players
Medalists at the 1980 Summer Olympics
Medalists at the 1992 Summer Olympics
Members of the Seimas
Olympic basketball players of Lithuania
Olympic basketball players of the Soviet Union
Olympic bronze medalists for Lithuania
Olympic bronze medalists for the Soviet Union
Olympic medalists in basketball
People from Anykščiai
Soviet men's basketball players
1978 FIBA World Championship players